"Who Will You Run To" is a song recorded by American rock band Heart. It was composed by Diane Warren and released as a single from Heart's ninth studio album, Bad Animals.

"Who Will You Run To" is one of a long list of hit songs written by Warren. Heart's version of her song became the band's eighth U.S. top-ten single, peaking at number seven. It also climbed to number thirty in the UK Singles Chart, where it was also available as a 12" single. An extended rock version of the song was Heart's first UK CD single release.

Cash Box called it a "powerful melodic rocker."

Charts

Weekly charts

Year-end charts

References 

Heart (band) songs
1987 singles
Song recordings produced by Ron Nevison
Songs written by Diane Warren
1987 songs
Capitol Records singles